William Gaines Farish (June 18, 1847 – January 22, 1931) was an American politician who served in the Virginia House of Delegates.

References

External links 

1847 births
1931 deaths
Democratic Party members of the Virginia House of Delegates
19th-century American politicians